Rochester Bridge in Rochester, Medway was for centuries the lowest fixed crossing of the River Medway in South East England. There have been several generations of bridge at this spot, and the current "bridge" is in fact four separate bridges: the "Old" bridge and "New" bridge carrying the A2 road, "Railway" bridge carrying the railway and the "Service" bridge carrying service pipes and cables. The bridge links the towns of Strood and Rochester in Medway. All except the railway bridge are owned and maintained by the Rochester Bridge Trust.

History

Roman
The Romans built a bridge across the River Medway as part of Watling Street, carrying traffic from London to Dover (the port for Continental Europe). This was almost certainly the first bridge at the site as the Romans were the first occupiers to have the necessary technology to bridge such a wide and fierce tidal river. The Roman engineers might have initially built a pontoon bridge to support and supply their invading armies; however this would have needed replacing by a stronger, more permanent bridge to support increased traffic. Victorian engineers discovered the Roman foundations when they were building the current "Old" bridge, they found that stone foundations had been used, probably to support a wooden deck.

Middle Ages
A wooden bridge existed in the Middle Ages since at least the year 960. In 1264, Simon de Montfort besieged the gate house and set fire to the bridge as part of his successful attempt to take Rochester. In the latter part of the 14th century the bridge consisted of nine stone piers supporting a wooden superstructure.  Administratively the responsibility for bridge was divided amongst local landowners and institutions. This worked reasonably well, though sometimes those liable refused to co-operate and had goods seized.  In 1311 for instance the King's bailiff, William Mot, seized a horse and five cows from the tenants of Westerham, however Richard Trewe and Hamon le Brun "rescued" the animals back and Richard "beat the said William".  Despite partial rebuilding, the bridge fell into disrepair and collapses occurred with the worrying frequency of about once a year. In 1339 the bridge was down for 24 weeks, then the first and third piers were found to be decayed (repairs estimated at £19 and £8 6s 8d).  In 1361 the bridge was in a dangerous state for 3 weeks and a boat had to be hired as a ferry.  In the winter of 1380–81 a large proportion of the bridge was carried away by the combined forces of meltwater and ice.  In 1382, the bridge being impassible" a commission was appointed to enquire as to those responsible for its maintenance.  The commission included John de Cobham who as supervisor of repairs ensured the bridge was passible by the following year.

1391–1856

A stone bridge was built by Sir John de Cobham and Sir Robert Knolles (or Knollys), finished in 1391. To ensure the maintenance of their new bridge, the two men instituted the Wardens and Commonalty of Rochester Bridge, two elected wardens were appointed with permission from Richard II to own land and use the income for the bridge. The Wardens and Commonalty received grants of land from Henry IV and Henry V, as well as money from other benefactors. The trust was able to maintain the bridge using income from property and investments, and materials from woods and quarries. A scheme of improvements was completed in 1824 to the plans of the engineer Daniel Asher Alexander. The bridge was widened and the two central arches merged into one to provide a wider channel for shipping. In 1856, when modern river traffic demanded a new structure the medieval bridge was demolished with the help of the Royal Engineers.

1857–1914

Cubbitt's cast iron bridge was built in 1857 to replace the stone bridge. This bridge was built downstream of the stone bridge, on the alignment of the current bridge and where the Romans had built theirs. One span was designed to swing open to allow river traffic, but the mechanism was never used and was eventually removed. The cast iron spans were below the road deck, making the bridge relatively low and meant that passing traffic on the river had to navigate to line up with the top of the arch or risk striking the bridge.

Not every ship was successful and many collisions occurred. These took their toll on the bridge and an inspection in 1909 showed fractured ribs and missing bolts. After a relatively short life a new bridge was needed.

From around 1908 the bridge also carried the tracks for the local tram system linking Strood and Frindsbury with Rochester, Chatham, Gillingham and Rainham.

1914 to present day
The cast iron bridge was reconstructed at a cost of £95,887. The bridge opened for traffic on 14 May 1914 with new features to allow more clearance for the many boats that had to pass under it. The supporting arched trusses were built further apart and above the road deck. Trams continued to use the bridge until the tram system was abandoned in 1930 and superseded by buses.

In 1970 a second road bridge was opened immediately next to the first, to increase capacity. The old bridge underwent major maintenance and complete refurbishment, completed in November 2006, to extend the lifespan another 30 years. As for all the work to the bridges, this was paid for by the Rochester Bridge Trust with the proceeds from the original endowments and was carried out at no cost to the public taxpayer.

National Cycle Route 1 passes over the road bridges.

Constructional methods
There are four extant bridges, and also the Roman bridge, and the Mediaeval bridge that was built 40m upstream, and the first railway bridge.

Roman bridge
The Roman Bridge was built circa AD 43 on the instructions of the Emperor Claudius. The flat bridge deck was supported on nine stone piers set on iron tipped oak timbers driven deep into the riverbed. To achieve this, a coffer-dam of two concentric circles of shallow piling was constructed around the site of each pier. The space between the two circles was then packed with clay to make the coffer-dam waterproof, and the water inside was pumped out to create a dry working area on the riverbed.  The main oak piling was then driven deep into the chalk bedrock. The piers were built within a timber framework; they were stone faced and packed with ragstone rubble. Across the piers three oak beams were placed and planks laid over that to form the road-deck.

Medieval bridge
This was a stone bridge of eleven arches. It was built by Henry Yevele between August 1387 September 1391. They were constructed from 10,000 piles that were connected by joists. The wooden structure was packed with chalk (the local stone) and then decked in elm planking. On these platforms were constructed 12 stone piers at irregular distances apart. There were connected by a drawbridge in bay 5, and gothic style stone arches for the other ten. Above these was the bridge deck with parapets. This was paved in Kentish ragstone.

Victorian bridge
The committee considered three proposals when the Medieval bridge needed to be replaced: a stone bridge, a suspension bridge and the cast iron bridge that was eventually built. The navy required a passage so masted vessels could proceed up stream. The ubiquitous Thames barge could lower its mast but other classes of vessel had fixed masts- this limited the choice to one.
 
It rested on foundations of cast iron cylinders sunk through the riverbed into the bedrock.

On the Strood side of the bridge was the ship passage: a channel  in width. It was spanned by a swing bridge consisting of six wrought iron girders turning on a cast iron roller path,  in diameter with 30 cast iron rollers. The swing bridge was delicately balanced. The total weight of the swing bridge and roadway was over 300 tonnes, it could have been rotated with ease 90 degrees upriver.

First railway bridge

The East Kent Railway built the first rail bridge (which opened on 29 March 1858) for its line from Strood to Chatham. It was designed and built by Joseph Cubitt, and had four spans, one of which could be opened to allow masted ships through, although this was later found to be unnecessary and so was fixed shut. The bridge was built of iron girders supported on masonry piers, 600 feet in length and weighing 700 tons. The East Kent Railway became the London Chatham and Dover Railway 1 August 1859 and in 1861 the bridge became a part of the newly completed Chatham Main Line from London to Dover.

Second railway bridge

The two rivals merged under a Joint Managing Committee in 1899 to form the South Eastern and Chatham Railway, and subsequent rationalisation saw the SER's Chatham Central branch closed on 1 October 1911, three years before World War I. In 1927 the Chatham Mainline was diverted to use the more substantial second railway bridge, and the original LCDR railway bridge was left unused for decades until it was eventually demolished, the piles being used for the second road bridge which opened in 1970.

Rochester Bridge Wardens and Rochester Bridge Trust
These days the road bridges and the services bridge are maintained by the Rochester Bridge Trust, the modern incarnation of Sir John de Cobham's Wardens and Commonalty of Rochester Bridge, which dates from 1399. The trust still owns some of the land gifted to the wardens and used the income derived from the endowments to pay for the new bridges in 1856 (now the westbound lanes of the A2) and 1970 (eastbound A2) as well as meeting all the costs of maintaining those bridges and part of Rochester Esplanade.

The trust is a charity with twelve trustees, known locally as the Bridge Wardens. Six are nominated by the local councils and six are local people appointed by the trust. The trust in its current form was created by an act of Parliament in 1908 and is regulated by the Charity Commission.

The Bridge Wardens
In February 2017 the wardens were:
Derek George Butler: Nominated by Maidstone Borough Council
Russell Graham Cooper: Appointed by the Bridge Trust
Philip Filmer: Nominated by Medway Council
Paul Harriott: Appointed by the Bridge Trust
Raymond Peter Harris: Nominated by Medway Council
Sarah Hohler: Nominated by Kent County Council
Peter John Homewood: Nominated by Kent County Council
Alan Leslie Jarrett: Nominated by Medway Council
Anne Frances Helen Logan: Appointed by the Bridge Trust
Russell John Race: Appointed by the Bridge Trust
John Alexander Spence: Appointed by the Bridge Trust
Richard George Thornby: Appointed by the Bridge Trust
These twelve nominated and appointed assistants then elected two of their number to serve as Junior Warden and Senior Warden.

Medway Tunnel
The trust also contributed to the construction of the Medway Tunnel (1996), a few miles downstream. In 2008 negotiations were completed by Medway Council which purchased the freehold of the tunnel from the Trust for £1 with a £3.6m contribution on future costs. It was the first immersed tube tunnel to be built in England and only the second of this type in the UK, the other being at Conwy, North Wales.

Charitable acts
The trust has also made grants for local good causes ranging from a few thousand pounds to more significant grants. In particular, contributions have been made to the restoration of many important historic buildings in Kent. The most recent of the larger grants have been for the restoration of the South Transept of Rochester Cathedral, and to appoint a Professor of Bridge and Tunnel Engineering at the University of Greenwich (Medway Campus). In the 1880s, the Trust founded Rochester and Maidstone Girls Grammar schools and made large endowments to the Sir Joseph Williamson's Mathematical School in Rochester and the Maidstone Boys Grammar School.

Bridge Chapel

The Bridge Chapel was built in 1383. It stopped being a chapel in 1548 and was used as a storeroom for bridge materials, a house, and later a pub and as a fruit shop. Over time it deteriorated and lost its roof. It was restored in the 1930s and used as a meeting room and exhibition space. Once a year, on All Souls’ Day (2 November) it used to hold a commemoration service for the founders of the Rochester Bridge Trust.

References

Further reading

External links 

 The Rochester Bridge Trust website with history of the Bridge Wardens and photos showing construction of current bridges and tunnel.
 The story of Rochester Bridge Medway Council website. Accessed 2006-09-05.

Buildings and structures completed in 1391
Bridges completed in 1856
Bridges completed in 1914
Bridges completed in 1970
Bridges completed in the 14th century
Bridge
Transport in Medway
Bridges in Kent
Through arch bridges in the United Kingdom
Stone bridges in the United Kingdom